Dobb is an English surname. Notable people with this surname include the following:

 James Dobb (born 1972), English motocross racer
 John Dobb (1901–1991), American baseball player
 Maurice Dobb (1900–1976), English economist

References 

English-language surnames